Amanchi Venkata Subrahmanyam (2 January 1957 – 8 November 2013), better known and credited by his initials AVS, was an Indian actor, comedian, producer, director, and journalist known for his works in Telugu cinema. A.V.S. was known particularly for his comic dialogue delivery, and expressions. He starred in over five hundred feature films and has garnered four state Nandi Awards, including Best Comedian, and Best character actor.

Early life and career 
AVS was born on 2 January 1957 in Tenali, Guntur district, Andhra Pradesh. He was introduced to the film industry by director Bapu through his film Mister Pellam in 1993. With this film, he became a comedy star in the Telugu film industry. For his role he received many awards including Nandi Award by Government of Andhra Pradesh. He won many private and Government awards for both in films and in TV shows. He produced two films: Uncle and Ori Nee Prema Bangaaram Kanu...! and directed four films, namely Super Heroes, Ori Ni Prema Bangaaram Kaanu..!, Roommates, and Kothimooka. He was General Secretary of the Movie Artistes Association for 3 terms.

Death
AVS sustained kidney and liver trauma for some days. He had a liver transplant in 2008. He died on 8 November 2013 at his son's residence in Manikonda, Hyderabad after multiple organ failure.

Selected filmography

As actor

As director
1997 Super Heroes
2003 Ori Nee Prema Bangaram Kaanu (also producer)
2006 Roommates
2010 Kothimooka

As producer
2000 Uncle

As voice actor
 2000 Thenali - for Delhi Ganesh (Telugu version)

Awards 

Nandi Awards
Best Character Actor - Kothimooka (2011)
Special Jury Award - Uncle  (2000)
Best Male Comedian - Subha Lagnam - 1994
Special Jury Award - Mr. Pellam - 1993

References

External links

 http://avsfilm.blogspot.com

1957 births
2013 deaths
Indian male comedians
Male actors from Andhra Pradesh
Male actors in Telugu cinema
Indian male film actors
Telugu male actors
Telugu comedians
Nandi Award winners
Deaths from multiple organ failure
People from Guntur district
20th-century Indian male actors
21st-century Indian male actors
Liver transplant recipients